Aleksandr Krasko (born 7 April 1972) is a Belarusian athlete. He competed in the men's hammer throw at the 1996 Summer Olympics.

References

External links
 

1972 births
Living people
Athletes (track and field) at the 1996 Summer Olympics
Belarusian male hammer throwers
Olympic athletes of Belarus
People from Navapolatsk
Sportspeople from Vitebsk Region